Negar Moghaddam (born 30 May 1999) is an Iranian actress. She is known for her role as Golsa in the 2018 Iranian thriller drama Dressage, for which she won the Best Asian New Talent Actress Award at the 21st Shanghai International Film Festival.

Filmography

Film

Awards and nominations

References

External links 
 

Living people
1999 births
Iranian film actresses